The Deutscher Fecht-Verband (DFV) was the organ of the larger Deutscher Turn- und Sportbund responsible for governing the sport of archery in East Germany. One of the smaller sports associations in the nation, in 1988 the organization had 6,584 registered athletes and 673 trainers. After German reunification in late 1990 the DFV was absorbed by the German Fencing Federation (DFB).

Though its membership was comparatively small, the DFV produced several prominent athletes, including Olympians Udo Wagner, Mandy Niklaus, and Klaus Haertter.

Presidents of the DFV

See also
Deutscher Turn- und Sportbund
Sports associations (East Germany)

References

Sports governing bodies in East Germany
Sports organizations established in 1958
Organizations disestablished in 1990
1958 establishments in East Germany
1990 disestablishments in Germany